Mucolipin-2 also known as TRPML2 (transient receptor potential cation channel, mucolipin subfamily, member 2) is a protein that in humans is encoded by the MCOLN2 gene.  It is a member of the small family of the TRPML channels, a subgroup of the large protein family of TRP ion channels.

TRPML2 is associated with the Arf6-regulated trafficking pathway and is involved in the intracellular transport of membranes and membrane proteins.

See also
 transient receptor potential cation channel, mucolipin subfamily, member 1 (MCOLN1)
 transient receptor potential cation channel, mucolipin subfamily, member 3 (MCOLN3)
 TRPML

References

External links